Tampa Overlook is a neighborhood in the North Tampa section of Tampa, which represents District 7 of the Tampa City Council. The 2000 census numbers were unavailable; however, the latest estimated population was 1,877 and the population density was 4,904 people per square mile.

Geography
Tampa Overlook boundaries are roughly 15th Street to the west, Bougainvillea Avenue to the north, and Busch Boulevard/Annie Street to the south and 22nd Street to the east. The ZIP Code serving the neighborhood is 33612.

Education
Tampa Overlook is served by Hillsborough County Public Schools, which serves the city of Tampa and Hillsborough County.

References

External links
Tampa Overlook neighborhood detailed profile
Tampa Overlook (in Hillsborough County, FL) Populated Place Profile
Map of Tampa Overlook

Neighborhoods in Tampa, Florida